Rob Christiansen is an American musician and recording engineer, who played in the 1990s indie pop band Eggs and the Grenadine 'supergroup', and plays in the band Sisterhood of Convoluted Thinkers and The Shot Heard 'Round the World.  In 2006, he produced the Shot Heard 'Round the World's Ten Songs for Town & Country record.

References

External links
http://www.teenbeatrecords.com/artists/eggs.htm

Living people
American drummers
American audio engineers
Year of birth missing (living people)